Capital punishment is a legal penalty in Ghana. Ghana last executed in 1993. It is considered "Abolitionist in Practice." Capital punishment is a mandatory sentence for certain offenses. 

7 new death sentences were handed down in 2021. 165 people were on death row in Ghana at the end of 2021.

References

Ghana
Law of Ghana